Kevin Rooney (born May 21, 1993) is an American professional ice hockey forward for the Calgary Wranglers in the American Hockey League (AHL) while under contract to the Calgary Flames of the National Hockey League (NHL).

Playing career
Undrafted, Rooney played collegiate hockey with Providence College of the Hockey East and helped the Friars win the 2015 National Collegiate Athletic Association championship. After his senior year as captain of the Friars in the 2015–16 season, Rooney made his professional debut with the Albany Devils of the American Hockey League on an amateur try-out on March 29, 2016. He played out the season collecting 3 assists in 7 games.

Rooney opted to continue with the Albany Devils, signing a one-year extension deal on July 5, 2016. In the 2016–17 season, Rooney added 10 goals in 57 games with Albany before he was signed to his first NHL contract, on a one-year, entry-level deal for the remainder of the season with parent club, the New Jersey Devils on February 28, 2017. Three days later, Rooney was called up to New Jersey and made his NHL debut in a 1–0 loss to the Washington Capitals on March 2, 2017.

On July 26, 2017, the Devils re-signed Rooney to a one-year, two-way contract worth $650,000. Despite being cut from training camp, Rooney was recalled on September 27, 2017, to play in the preseason. He was sent back down to the AHL before the regular season began but was recalled again on January 25, 2018, due to numerous injured players. However the recall was short lived as he was sent back down the next day.

On August 13, 2018, Rooney signed a new two-year contract with the Devils. On November 20, 2018, Rooney was named captain of the Binghamton Devils.

After four seasons within the Devils organization, Rooney left as a free agent to sign a two-year, $1.5 million contract with rival club, the New York Rangers, on October 9, 2020.

On July 13, 2022, Rooney left the Rangers as a free agent and was signed a two-year $2.6 million contract with the Calgary Flames.

Personal life
Rooney is the nephew of former NHL winger Steve Rooney.

Career statistics

Regular season and playoffs

International

References

External links
 

1993 births
Living people
Albany Devils players
American men's ice hockey centers
Binghamton Devils players
Calgary Flames players
Calgary Wranglers players
Ice hockey players from Massachusetts
New Jersey Devils players
New York Rangers players
Providence Friars men's ice hockey players
People from Canton, Massachusetts
Undrafted National Hockey League players